Amazon Pay is an online payments processing service owned by Amazon. Launched in 2007, Amazon Pay uses the consumer base of Amazon.com and focuses on giving users the option to pay with their Amazon accounts on external merchant websites. As of March 2021, the service became available in Austria, Belgium, Cyprus, Denmark, France, Germany, Hungary, India, Republic of Ireland, Italy, Japan, Luxembourg, Netherlands, Portugal, Spain, Sweden, Switzerland, United Kingdom, and the United States.

Amazon Pay announced a partnership with Worldpay in 2019, allowing Worldpay clients to enable Amazon Pay as a part of the same integration.

Products
Amazon Pay incorporates a variety of products for buyers and merchants to process online payments.

Amazon Pay
Amazon Pay provides the option to purchase goods and services from websites and mobile apps using the addresses and payment methods stored in the Amazon account, such as credit cards or a direct debit bank account or the Unified Payments Interface (UPI) in India.

Amazon Pay Express
Amazon Pay Express is a payments processing service for simple e-commerce use cases on websites. It is built on Amazon Pay but without requiring a full e-commerce integration, it can be used to create a button that can be copied and pasted onto a website or added via a WordPress plug-in. It is best suited for merchants selling a small number of products with a single item in each order, such as a digital download.

Amazon Pay UPI
On 14 February 2019, Amazon launched Amazon Pay Unified Payments Interface (UPI) for Android users in partnership with Axis Bank. This service issue UPI IDs to its Indian customers to allow for secure payments. Mechanism of Amazon Pay UPI is same as other UPI apps like BHIM, Paytm and PhonePe. Anyone with Amazon India app can access this service.

Evolution

Checkout by Amazon (CBA)
Checkout by Amazon (CBA) was an e-commerce solution that allowed web merchants to accept Amazon account information and use Amazon for payment processing. CBA could manage several aspects of the transaction, including order processing, promotional discounts, shipping rates, sales tax calculation, and up-selling. Depending on the merchant's needs, CBA could be integrated into the merchant's systems with manual processing (through Seller Central) or through SOAP APIs or downloadable CSV files. CBA also claimed to reduce the bad debt because of Amazon's fraud detection capabilities. CBA was discontinued in the UK and Germany in 2016 and in the US in April 2017.

Amazon Flexible Payments Service (FPS)
Flexible Payments Service (FPS) was an Amazon Web Service that allowed money transfer between two entities using a technology built on single, multiple, and unlimited use payment tokens. Merchants managed their service use via API or solution providers. They accessed the account through a merchant account on the Amazon Payments website. The service was launched as a limited beta in August 2007 and, later in February 2009, was promoted to General Availability. FPS differed from CBA because FPS did not handle additional capabilities associated with order processing, such as promotions, tax, and shipping. FPS also provided the payments processing for the Amazon Web Services DevPay service but was discontinued in June 2015.

GoPago technology acquisition
In 2013 Amazon acquired GoPago's technology (mPayment) and hired their engineering and product teams. Amazon was interested in the mobile payment business. GoPago's app allows shoppers to order and pay for goods and services before arriving at a company.

Pay with Alexa
In 2020, Amazon enabled Alexa users to pay for gas by talking to Alexa.

Security
On September 22, 2010, Amazon published a security advisory  regarding a security flaw in its Amazon Payments SDKs. This flaw allows a shopper to shop for free in web stores using those SDKs. Amazon mandated all web stores to upgrade to its new SDKs before November 1, 2010. Amazon acknowledged security researcher Rui Wang for finding this bug. The detail of the flaw is documented in the paper "How to Shop for Free Online - Security Analysis of Cashier-as-a-Service Based Web Stores" by Rui Wang, Shuo Chen, XiaoFeng Wang, and Shaz Qadeer.

See also
Digital wallet
PayPal
List of on-line payment service providers

References

External links
Official website

Payments
Financial services companies established in 2007
Banking technology
Online payments
Mobile payments
WordPress